Axeman or Axemen may refer to:

People
Axeman of New Orleans, a serial killer in New Orleans circa 1918 – 1920
John Axford, a Canadian professional baseball pitcher
Nicholas Walters, Jamaican boxer whose nickname is "The Axe Man"
 Axemen, members of Black Axe (organized crime group), a criminal organisation that originated in Nigeria

Sports
Acadia Axemen of Acadia University
Ajax Axemen, Canadian hockey team now known as the Ajax Attack
Bemidji Axemen, American professional indoor football team
Jacksonville Axemen, American semi-professional rugby league team
Three Oaks Senior High School Axemen
A participant in a woodchopping competition

Film, television, music
Axeman (film), a 2013 horror film
Ax Men, an American reality television series
The Axeman, a fictional character in American Horror Story: Coven, based on the Axeman of New Orleans
The Axemen, a New Zealand band
The Axe Man, a 1996 album by Smokin' Joe Kubek

See also
Axmann, a surname
Hatchet man (disambiguation)